Fındıklı, called Foundouklia before the 1923 population exchange between Greece and Turkey, is a quarter of the city Amasya, Amasya District, Amasya Province, Turkey. Its population is 524 (2021).

References

Amasya